Verlina Reynolds-Jackson  (born July 26, 1971) is an American Democratic Party politician who represents the 15th Legislative District in the New Jersey General Assembly. Previously a member of the Trenton City Council, Reynolds-Jackson was sworn into office on February 15, 2018, to succeed Elizabeth Maher Muoio, who left office after being nominated to serve as Treasurer of New Jersey.

She served in the Assembly as the Deputy Majority Leader from 2020-2021 and has been the Constituent Outreach Chair since 2022.

Early life 
A resident of Trenton, New Jersey, Reynolds-Jackson attended Trenton Central High School. She graduated from Trenton State College (now The College of New Jersey) with a bachelor's degree in sociology and from Central Michigan University with a Master of Science in administration. She has worked for the New Jersey Department of Community Affairs in its Division of Housing and for the Mercer County Board of Social Services. First elected in 2010, Reynolds-Jackson was elected to a second term in office to represent Trenton's East Ward for a four-year term running from July 1, 2014, through June 30, 2018, receiving 42% of the votes cast in the ward among the three candidates running for the seat. As a Democratic county committee member, she was involved in political campaigns across Mercer County in 2016 and 2017. She was elected by her peers in October 2014 to serve as the City Council's vice president, though two councilmembers voted against the appointment, claiming that the position of vice president had been created improperly.

New Jersey Assembly 
Assemblywoman Elizabeth Maher Muoio was nominated by Governor of New Jersey Phil Murphy to serve as the Treasurer of New Jersey. She resigned from office effective January 15, 2018, as well as from her position as director of economic development for Mercer County to begin work in the executive branch, in advance of her confirmation by the New Jersey Senate; her resignation came less than a week after being sworn into office for her second full term in the Assembly. Reynolds-Jackson was chosen at a February 10 Democratic county convention from Mercer County and Hunterdon County to succeed Muoio until a November 2018 special election; in the second round of voting, Reynolds-Jackson received a majority of the votes cast by committee members, defeating Mercer County Freeholder Anthony Verrelli.

In 2020, she was one of the primary sponsors of Assembly Bill 4454 (now N.J.S.A. 18A:35-4.36a) which requires a curriculum on diversity and inclusion to be a component of the school curriculum for students in kindergarten through twelfth grade.

Committee assignments 
Committee assignments for the 2022—23 Legislative Session session are:
Commerce and Economic Development, Vice-Chair
Budget
Higher Education
Joint Committee on the Public Schools

District 15 
Each of the 40 districts in the New Jersey Legislature has one representative in the New Jersey Senate and two members in the New Jersey General Assembly. The representatives from the 15th District for the 2022—23 Legislative Session are:
Senator Shirley Turner (D)
Assemblywoman Verlina Reynolds-Jackson (D)
Assemblyman Anthony Verrelli (D)

References

External links
Legislative webpage

1971 births
Living people
African-American state legislators in New Jersey
African-American women in politics
Central Michigan University alumni
Democratic Party members of the New Jersey General Assembly
New Jersey city council members
Politicians from Trenton, New Jersey
The College of New Jersey alumni
Trenton Central High School alumni
Women state legislators in New Jersey
21st-century American politicians
Women city councillors in New Jersey
African-American city council members in New Jersey
21st-century American women politicians
21st-century African-American women
21st-century African-American politicians
20th-century African-American people
20th-century African-American women